The southern driftfish or ragfish, Icichthys australis, is a medusafish of the genus Icichthys found around the world in all southern oceans between latitudes 50° S and 60° S, from the surface down to 2,000 m.  Its length is from 35 to 80 cm.

References
 
 Tony Ayling & Geoffrey Cox, Collins Guide to the Sea Fishes of New Zealand, (William Collins Publishers Ltd, Auckland, New Zealand 1982) 

Centrolophidae
Fish described in 1966